James "Jim" Bash Cuno (born April 6, 1951 in St. Louis) is an American art historian and curator. From 2011–22 Cuno served as President and Chief Executive Officer of the J. Paul Getty Trust.

Career
A native of St. Louis, Cuno received a Bachelor of Arts in History from Willamette University in 1973. He then earned two Master of Arts degrees in Art History from the University of Oregon and Harvard University, in 1978 and 1980 respectively. In 1977, Cuno married his Willamette classmate, Sarah Stewart. He continued on at Harvard to receive a Doctor of Philosophy in Art History in 1985, and his doctoral dissertation was on the artist Charles Philipon.

While working on the doctorate, Cuno worked as Assistant Curator of Prints at the Harvard Art Museums from 1980 to 1983. In that final year, he was hired as Assistant Professor of Art History at Vassar College, a position that he held until 1986.
 
Cuno quickly began a career an illustrious career in museum directorship, serving as the director of many notable institutions within the United States and abroad. He first served as director of the Grunwald Center for Graphic Arts at the Hammer Museum from 1986 to 1989, and the Hood Museum of Art until 1991. Cuno was then appointed Elizabeth and John Moors Cabot Director of the Harvard Art Museums from 1991 to 2002, replacing Edgar Peters Bowron, and then moved on to The Courtauld Institute of Art for a year from 2003 to 2004, succeeding Eric Fernie. While at Harvard, he was elected to the American Academy of Arts and Sciences in 2001. He left the Courtauld to head the Art Institute of Chicago as Eloise W. Martin Director until 2011, replacing James N. Wood. In that final year, Cuno became the President and Chief Executive Officer of the J. Paul Getty Trust, and retired as of July 31, 2022.

During his career, Cuno has also served as director of the Association of Art Museum Directors.

Works
1989: French Caricature and the French Revolution, 1789-1799. 
2006: Whose Muse?: Art Museums and the Public Trust. 
2007: The Silk Road and Beyond: Travel, Trade, and Transformation.  
2008: Who Owns Antiquity?: Museums and the Battle over Our Ancient Heritage.  
2009: The Modern Wing: Renzo Piano and the Art Institute of Chicago. 
2009: Master Paintings in the Art Institute of Chicago. 
2012: Whose Culture?: The Promise of Museums and the Debate over Antiquities. 
2012: Museums Matter: In Praise of the Encyclopedic Museum.

See also
List of American Academy of Arts and Sciences members (1994–2005)
List of Dartmouth College faculty
List of Harvard University people
List of people associated with the University of London
List of people from St. Louis
List of University of California, Los Angeles people
List of University of Oregon alumni
List of Willamette University alumni

References

External links
American Academy of Arts and Sciences profile

1951 births
Living people
Writers from St. Louis
American art historians
American art curators
Willamette University alumni
University of Oregon alumni
Harvard Graduate School of Arts and Sciences alumni
Vassar College faculty
Directors of museums in the United States
Hammer Museum
Dartmouth College faculty
Directors of the Courtauld Institute of Art
Directors of the Art Institute of Chicago
People associated with the J. Paul Getty Museum